The Jin-Cha-Ji Border Region was an area under the control of the Chinese Communist Party during the time of the Chinese Communist Revolution.

After their success in the Battle of Pingxingguan in September 1937, in October 1937, the 115th Division of the Eighth Route Army was ordered to occupy the Mount Wutai area of Shanxi in order to set up an Anti-Japanese Base Area . This was called the Shanxi-Chahar-Hebei Anti-Japanese Base Area, often referred to as a communist Border Area or Liberated Area. The abbreviated names of the three provinces were often used to describe the area, thus it was known as Jin-Cha-Ji in modern transliteration. In older Western literature it was often called Chin-Cha-Ki.
Note that the term Border Area was used in official descriptions, for example, the postal service, set up in November 1937, was named the Shanxi-Hebei-Chahar Border Area Provisional Post. (Renamed the Shanxi-Chahar-Hebei Border Area Provisional Post in January 1938). The separate communist postal service was discontinued in October 1938 and Nationalist stamps were used in Jin-Cha-Ji until after the end of the war against Japan in 1945, when the Jin-Cha-Ji Border Area postal service resumed. It was initially based in Zhangjiakou and the service carried on until the Border Area was subsumed into the North China People's Post in 1949.
Details of the Jin-Cha-Ji Border Area administration are hard to find in English, as they are for all of the communist Border Areas.

References